The Primeval Structure Telescope (PaST), also called 21 Centimetre Array (21CMA), is a Chinese radio telescope array designed to detect the earliest luminous objects in the universe, including the first stars, supernova explosions, and black holes. All of these objects were strong sources of ultraviolet radiation, so they ionised the material surrounding them. The structure of this reionisation reflects the overall density structure at the redshift of luminous-object formation.

Overview
PaST will consist an array of some ten-thousand log-periodic antennas spread over several square kilometers. It will capture a detailed radio image of the sky in the range of 1420 megahertz.  The telescope is built on the high plateau of Ulastai in the west of Xinjiang province, a remote area away from most television and radios signals that may interfere the weak 21 cm background signals.

The hydrogen line, 21 centimeter line or HI line refers to the electromagnetic radiation spectral line that is created by a change in the energy state of neutral hydrogen atoms. This electromagnetic radiation is at the precise frequency of 1420.40575177 MHz, which is equivalent to the vacuum wavelength of 21.10611405413 cm in free space. This wavelength or frequency falls within the microwave radio region of the electromagnetic spectrum, and it is observed frequently in radio astronomy, since those radio waves can penetrate the large clouds of interstellar cosmic dust that are opaque to visible light.

The microwaves of the hydrogen line come from the atomic transition between the two hyperfine levels of the hydrogen 1s ground state with an energy difference of 5.87433 µeV. The frequency of the quanta that are emitted by this transition between two different energy levels is given by Planck's equation.

See also 
 List of radio telescopes

References 

 Peterson, J. B.; Pen, U. L.; Wu, X. P., 2004, "The PrimevAl Structure Telescope".
 Pen, U. L.; Wu, X. P.; Peterson, J. B., 2004, "Forecast for Epoch-of-Reionization as Viewable by the PrimevAl Structure Telescope (PAST)", Chinese Journal of Astronomy and Astrophysics.

External links

Radio telescopes
Buildings and structures in Xinjiang
Chinese telescopes
Interferometric telescopes